The second season of 3rd Rock from the Sun, an American television sitcom, began on September 22, 1996, and ended on March 9, 1997. It aired on NBC. The region 1 DVD was released on October 25, 2005.

Cast and characters

Main cast 
 John Lithgow as Dick Solomon
 Kristen Johnston as Sally Solomon
 French Stewart as Harry Solomon
 Joseph Gordon-Levitt as Tommy Solomon
 Jane Curtin as Dr. Mary Albright

Recurring cast 
 Simbi Khali as Nina Campbell
 Elmarie Wendel as Mrs. Mamie Dubcek
 Wayne Knight as Officer Don Leslie Orville
 David DeLuise as Bug Pollone
 Ian Lithgow as Leon
 Danielle Nicolet as Caryn
 Chris Hogan as Aubrey Pitman
 Ileen Getz as Dr. Judith Draper
 Shay Astar as August Leffler
 Jan Hooks as Vicki Dubcek
 Ron West as Dr. Vincent Strudwick

Episodes

References

External links 
 
 

2
1996 American television seasons
1997 American television seasons